Let Sleeping Dogs... is an album released under the name The Dogs D'Amour in 2005. In a similar sense to the previous album; When Bastards Go to Hell this release differed largely from the band's more well known material, it is essentially a Tyla solo album, as he recorded all instruments and wrote all of the songs on it.

Track listing
 "Never Give Up"  	
 "All of Them Great"  	
 "Life's a Pain"  	
 "Loves Ya"  	
 "Power"  	
 "War of the World"  	
 "Live, Love, Die"  	
 "Love of My Life"  	
 "A Thousand Days"  	
 "King, Queen, Jack or Joker?"  	
 "Demons"  	
 "Let Sleeping Dogs Lie"

Band
Tyla - lead vocals, all instruments
Yella - backing vocals

2005 albums
The Dogs D'Amour albums